De Sio is a surname of Italian origin. It may refer to:

Denise De Sio (b. 1952), Italian-American Lesbian Community leader
Giuliana De Sio (b. 1956), Italian actress
Teresa De Sio (b. 1955), Italian folk singer-songwriter
Vincenzo De Sio (b. 1972), Italian former football player

See also
Desio, an Italian municipality in the province of Monza.

Italian-language surnames